The following ships of the Indian Navy have been named INS Beas:

  was a Type 41  launched in 1958, commissioned in 1960 and broken up in 1992
  is a  guided-missile frigate launched in 2000

Indian Navy ship names